Ardbeg distillery (Scottish Gaelic: Taigh-staile na h-Àirde Bige) is a Scotch whisky distillery in Ardbeg on the south coast of the isle of Islay, Argyll and Bute, Scotland, in the Inner Hebrides group of islands. The distillery is owned by Louis Vuitton Moët Hennessy, and produces a heavily peated Islay whisky. The distillery uses malted barley sourced from the maltings in Port Ellen.

History of the distillery
The Ardbeg distillery has been producing whisky since 1798, and began commercial production in 1815. Like most Scottish distilleries, for most of its history, its whisky was produced for use in blended whisky, rather than as a single malt. By 1886 the distillery produced 300,000 gallons of whisky per year, and employed 60 workers. Production was halted in 1981, but resumed on a limited basis in 1989 and continued at a low level through late 1996, during the period when Ardbeg was owned by Hiram Walker. In 1997 the distillery was bought and reopened by Glenmorangie plc (subsequently taken over by the French company LVMH on 28 December 2004) with production resuming on 25 June 1997 and full production resuming in 1998. The distillery was reopened by Ed Dodson in 1997 and handed over to Stuart Thomson, who managed it from 1997 to 2006. Michael "Mickey" Heads, an Islay native and former manager at Jura who had worked at Ardbeg years earlier, took over on 12 March 2007. Colin Gordon has followed in his footsteps in August 2020. In July 2022, the distillery sold a 1975 cask to a private collector for £16million, beating Macallan's record for the highest cask selling price.

The name Ardbeg is an anglicisation of the Scottish Gaelic An Àird Bheag, meaning The Small Promontory.

Awards
Ardbeg's offerings have garnered an array of awards at international spirit ratings competitions.  For example:

Jim Murray's Whisky Bible 2008 awarded the Ten Years Old expression the title of 2008 World Whisky of the Year and Scotch Single Malt of the Year.  The Ten Years Old also won a series of medals at the 2006-2012 San Francisco World Spirits Competition, winning two gold and six silver medals over that stretch.
Jim Murray's Whisky Bible 2009 and Whisky Bible 2010  awarded the Uigeadail expression the title of 2009 and 2010 World Whisky of the Year and Scotch Single Malt of the Year.  The San Francisco World Spirits Competition awarded the Uigeadail two double gold, three gold, and two silver medals between 2006 and 2012.
Ardbeg Galileo won the World's Best Single Malt Whisky in the 2013 World Whiskies Awards.

Production
The distillery output is quite big for a distillery with only two pot stills. The wash still has a capacity of about 18,000 litres and the spirit still of about 17,000 litres. This produces approximately 10,000 barrels (1.4 million liters) of spirit per year. The distillery employs about sixty people and also provides them with dwelling on premises.   Since 2018, a new still house is under construction which will double Ardbeg's distilling capacity.

In 2011, 20 vials of Ardbeg spirit and wood particles were sent to the International Space Station to investigate their interaction. They returned on 12 September 2014.<ref>Ardbeg 'space whisky' back on Earth after flavour experiment BBC', 12 September 2014.</ref>

In 2022, Ardbeg released the 13-year-old limited edition called "Fermutation," which has seen the longest fermentation in Ardbeg's history. Ardbeg Distillery was forced to open washback lids which started a three-week-long fermentation.

Products

The Whiskies of Ardbeg are usually heavily peated Malts. Compared to other Islay Malts Ardbeg doesn't focus on the sea and salt tastes. They rather focus on aromas of spices, malt or sweet tones like vanilla and chocolate.

The core range of Ardbeg consists of the Ardbeg TEN, Uigeadail and Corryvreckan. The TEN is named after its age. Uigeadail was named after Loch Uigeadail, a lake which is a source of water for the distillery. The Corryvreckan bottle takes its name from a famous sea vortex between the Isle of Jura and the Isle of Scarba.

Recently the Ardbeg distillery brought out quite a number of special releases with no age statement (Supernova, Ardbog, Alligator).

Cultural references
Ardbeg inspired the Finnish composer of contemporary music, Osmo Tapio Räihälä, to write the symphonic poem Ardbeg—The Ultimate Piece For Orchestra'' (2003); it was recorded by the Finnish Radio Symphony Orchestra on 28 April 2011.

In Rei Hiroe's manga series Black Lagoon, Ardbeg is the favorite whisky of the character Dutch.

See also
 List of whisky distilleries in Scotland
 List of historic whisky distilleries

References

Notes

Bibliography

External links

 Ardbeg official website

Distilleries in Scotland
Scottish malt whisky
Whisky distilleries in Islay
1815 establishments in Scotland
LVMH brands